A woman is an adult female human.

Woman, A Woman, or The Woman may also refer to:

Film
 Woman (1918 film), an American silent film directed by Maurice Tourneur
 Woman (1968 film), a three-part South Korean film
 Woman (2019 film), a French documentary
 A Woman (1915 film), an American silent film by Charlie Chaplin
 A Woman (2010 film), an American-Italian drama by Giada Colagrande
 The Woman (1915 film), an American drama silent film directed by George Melford
 The Woman (2011 film), an American horror film directed by Lucky McKee

Literature
 Woman (Australian magazine), a women's magazine 1934–1954
 Woman (UK magazine), a women's weekly magazine since 1937
 The Woman (novel), a 2010 novel by Jack Ketchum and Lucky McKee

Music

Albums
 Woman (BoA album) or the title song, 2018
 Woman (Burt Bacharach album) or the title song, 1979
 Woman, by Himiko Kikuchi, 1983
 Woman (Jill Scott album), 2015
 Woman (Jon Stevens album) or the title song, 2015
 Woman (Justice album), 2016
 Woman (Mike McGear album) or the title song, 1972
 Woman (Nancy Sinatra album), 1972
 Woman (Rhye album) or the title song, 2013
 Woman, by Syleena Johnson, 2020
 Woman, by Wallis Bird, 2019
 A Woman (Margo Smith album), 1979
 A Woman (Qveen Herby album) or the title song, 2021

Songs
"Woman" (Cat Power song), 2018
"Woman" (Doja Cat song), 2021
"Woman" (John Lennon song), 1980
"Woman" (Kesha song), 2017
"Woman" (Little Simz song), 2021
"Woman" (Mumford & Sons song), 2019
"Woman" (Neneh Cherry song), 1996
"Woman" (Paul McCartney song), released by Peter and Gordon, 1966
"Woman" (Wolfmother song), 2005
"Woman (Sensuous Woman)", by Don Gibson, 1972
"Woman", by Anti-Nowhere League from We Are...The League, 1982
"Woman", by City and Colour from If I Should Go Before You, 2015
"Woman", by Delta Goodrem from Delta, 2007
"Woman", by Ellie Goulding from Brightest Blue, 2020
"W-o-m-a-n", by Etta James, 1955
"Woman", by Foxes from Friends in the Corner, 2021
"Woman", by Free from Free, 1969
"Woman", by Harry Styles from Harry Styles, 2017
"Woman", by James Gang from James Gang Rides Again, 1970
"Woman", by Klaatu, 1988
"Woman", by Level 42 from The Early Tapes, 1982
"Woman", by Tina Arena from Just Me, 2001
"Woman", by Zager & Evans from 2525 (Exordium & Terminus), 1969
"A Woman", by Tory Lanez from Daystar, 2020
"The Woman", by Aretha Franklin from A Rose Is Still a Rose, 1998

Religion
 Mary, mother of Jesus, addressed as woman by Jesus in John 19:26
 Woman of the Apocalypse, a character in the Book of Revelation

Other uses
 Woman (wrestler), ring name of Nancy Benoit, American professional wrestling valet and wife of Chris Benoit
 The Woman series, paintings by Willem de Kooning
 WoMan, a GNU Emacs man pages browser

See also
 Donna (disambiguation)
 Femme (disambiguation)
 Frau (disambiguation)
 Mujer (disambiguation)
 Women (disambiguation)
 Womyn, an alternate spelling for woman